Bizarre was a 64-gun ship of the line of the French Navy. She was present at two major battles, and was wrecked in 1782.

Career 
Built on a design by François Coulomb, Bizarre entered service in 1753. She took part in the Seven Years' War, notably attacking an English convoy off Ireland on 10 October 1758, along with the 28-gun corvette Mignonne. Together they captured 44 merchantmen as well as the convoy's escort .

In 1777, she was under Louis Augustin de Monteclerc. 

She was activated for the American Revolutionary War under Captain La Landelle-Roscanvec and appointed to Suffren's squadron in the Indian Ocean. She was present at the  Battle of Negapatam in 1782, although she did not take part in the action. She was also at the Battle of Trincomalee.

After the Battle of Trincomalee, La Landelle-Roscanvec requested to be relieved and left the squadron, embarking on Pulvérisateur on 3 September 1782, bound for Isle de France. Suffren replaced him with Lieutenant Tréhouret de Pennelé.

Fate
On 4 October 1782, she ran aground near Cuddalore and became a total loss. Her commanding officer, Lieutenant Tréhouret de Pennelé, was dismissed from the Navy.

Notes, citations, and references

Notes

Citations

Bibliography
 
 
 

Ships of the line of the French Navy
1751 ships
Maritime incidents in 1782